Markedness is the state of being marked.

Marked may also refer to:

 Marked (TV series), a 2009 American television documentary series on tattoos
 Marked (novel), a 2007 fantasy novel in P.C. and Kristin Cast's House of Night series
 "Marked", a 2011 song by Erika M. Anderson
 Marked, a 2009–2010 romance novel series by Sylvia Day
 Zaznamovani (English: The Marked), a 1940 collection of short stories by Bogomir Magajna

See also
Marked bill
 Marked Men (disambiguation)